Eurovoetbal is an international football (soccer) tournament for players under 21, held annually in the city of Groningen around Pentecost.

The tournament started in 1977 when local football clubs Be Quick 1887, Velocitas and GRC, as well as the district Groningen of the Royal Dutch Football Association, celebrated their 90th, 80th, 75th and 70th anniversaries respectively. Five-thousand and five-hundred spectators saw the youth players of English side Crystal Palace win the first tournament.

Finals and Most Valuable Players

Notable participating players
Fernando Gago
Ulf Kirsten
Patrick Kluivert
Arjen Robben
Clarence Seedorf
Edwin van der Sar

Dutch football friendly trophies
Football in Groningen (city)
Sports competitions in Groningen (city)
Youth football competitions in the Netherlands